Dardi may refer to:

 Dardi people, in India, Pakistan & Afghanistan
 Dardic languages, several of which have sometimes been known as "Dardi"
 Dardi school, a tradition within the Italian school of swordsmanship
 Jagjit Singh Dardi (born 1949), journalist and an educationist from the Indian State of Punjab
 Teja Singh Dardi (died  1998), Indian politician

See also
 Dardis (disambiguation)